Peace Is Possible: Conversations with Arab and Israeli Leaders from 1988 to the Present  is a book by S. Daniel Abraham, with a foreword by former U.S. President Bill Clinton. The book was released in hardcover format on March 13, 2006 by Newmarket Press.

The book is a first-hand account of Slim Fast founder Abraham's more than 15 years of peacemaking efforts in the Middle East, as well as the various reasons he believes peace is possible.

Hillary Clinton spoke about Abraham's book at Princeton University, while recognizing the creation of the "S. Daniel Abraham Visiting Professorship in Middle East Policy Studies" and its first holder, Daniel C. Kurtzer.

The book is utilized as a resource by Case Western Reserve University, and the United States Air Force utilizes other books by Abraham as part of Middle-East peace workshops.

With former congressman Wayne Owens, Abraham established the Center for Middle East Peace & Economic Cooperation.  Abraham's work on peace is also featured as part of the Clinton Global Initiative.

Statements by individuals involved in peace process
Source

President Bill Clinton
"When peace finally comes to the Middle East, it will be because of people like Dan Abraham"

Shimon Peres
"Dan Abraham's book is in a category apart.  I do not know of any other "private diplomacy" that has done so much to foster the peace process.  Dan Abraham and Wayne Owens have spanned the length and breadth of the Middle East with keen interest and a sense of mission.  They generated a deep feeling of trust among the people they met and never abandoned hope even in the most difficult of times.  As dramatic as their story may be, it nonetheless strikes us by its distinctive sincerity.  Their account of it is related fairly and honestly.  This is indeed a book that merits attention, also because of the surprises it enfolds." Shimon Peres

Elie Wiesel
"Whether utopian or realistic, Dan Abraham's obsession to bring peace between Israelis and Palestinians is remarkable.  His behind-the-scenes encounters with various protagonists of this endless historical drama will help the reader understand its complexity as well as its need for a peaceful resolution."

Saeb Erekat
"I may agree or disagree with my friend Danny Abraham's assessments, but there is no disagreement on Danny's commitment to the two state-solution -- Palestine next to Israel, living peacefully side by side.  I admire Danny's courage, unwavering commitment and relentless efforts, which are evident in this book, to achieve peace and reconciliation, a historic treaty and an end of conflict between Palestinians and Israelis.  Danny was a creative pioneer in his thinking and in his hard work to advance the peace process, demonstrating how imaginative and helpful track-two diplomacy could be.

Ehud Olmert
"Danny Abraham is one of those unique people who, without any formal appointment, have dedicated their lives to search for peace in our region.  He has played an imperative role over the years and has a fascinating story to tell."

Notable individuals interviewed by author
Arab leaders
 Hosni Mubarak
 Hafez Assad
 Crown Prince Abdullah
 Yasser Arafat
Israeli prime ministers
 Yitzhak Shamir
 Yitzhak Rabin
 Shimon Peres
 Ehud Barak
 Ariel Sharon

External links
 Newmarket Press, publisher's site on book
 Table of Contents, Library of Congress

References

Israeli–Palestinian conflict books
Bill Clinton
Books about the Arab–Israeli conflict
2006 non-fiction books